Feistritztal is since 2015 a municipality in Hartberg-Fürstenfeld District in Styria, Austria.

The municipality was founded as part of the Styria municipal structural reform,
on 31 December 2014, from the dissolved independent municipalities Blaindorf, Kaibing, Sankt Johann bei Herberstein and Siegersdorf bei Herberstein (all in political District Hartberg-Fürstenfeld), plus Hirnsdorf (in political Weiz District).

The border of the Hartberg-Fürstenfeld District and Weiz District was altered, that the new municipality lies completely in Hartberg-Fürstenfeld District.

Municipality arrangement 

The municipal territory includes the following seven sections (populations as of 2015):
 Blaindorf (305)
 Hirnsdorf (673)
 Hofing (128)
 Illensdorf (230)
 Kaibing (391)
 Sankt Johann bei Herberstein (387)
 Siegersdorf bei Herberstein (293)

The municipality consists of 7 Katastralgemeinden (areas 2015):
 Blaindorf
 Hirnsdorf (456.78 ha)
 Hofing (535.21 ha)
 Kaibing
 St. Johann bei Herberstein (282.11 ha)
 Siegersdorf

Municipal council 

The council has 15 members and convened with the following parties
 9 ÖVP
 4 SPÖ
 2 FPÖ

The last election had the following results:

Tourism 

The town along with Anger, Floing, Puch bei Weiz and Stubenberg has the tourism group "Apfelland Stubenbergsee". Which seat is in Stubenberg.

Culture and sights 
 Pfarrkirche Sankt Johann bei Herberstein in Sankt Johann bei Herberstein
 Filialkirche Maria Fieberbründl

References

External links 

 Offizieller Internetauftritt der Gemeinde

Cities and towns in Hartberg-Fürstenfeld District